Wharnsby is a surname. Notable people with the surname include: 

David Wharnsby (born 1967), Canadian film editor
Dawud Wharnsby (born 1972), Canadian singer-songwriter